Sir Rex de Charembac Nan Kivell CMG (born Reginald Nankivell, 8 April 18987 June 1977) was a New Zealand-born British art collector, who was knighted on the recommendation of the government of Australia, a country he never visited, for the gift and sale to the National Library of Australia of his collection of books, paintings, prints, documents, manuscripts and artefacts relating to the history of Australia, New Zealand and the Pacific. He has been described as "an archetypal outsider – illegitimate, homosexual, self-educated and antipodean".

Early life
Born as Reginald Nankivell in Christchurch, New Zealand, to an unmarried mother, he was raised in the home of his maternal grandparents. He was educated at New Brighton Public School and the Royal College of Science.

Becoming a collector and dealer
As an under age youth and listing his profession as bookbinder, Reginald Nankivell enlisted with the New Zealand Expeditionary Force on 31 May 1916. He served in England (1916–1919) on the staff of No. 1 New Zealand Hospital General Hospital, Brockenhurst, Hampshire (part of his collection of photos was taken here) and at the New Zealand Command Depot, Codford, Wiltshire. On an extended period of leave in England, from October 1917 to May 1918, he began to pursue his growing antiquarian interests.  Around 1918 he started to style himself Rex de Charembac Nan Kivell.

He attributed an early interest in collecting to Sydney Smith, an antiquarian book dealer in Christchurch whom Nan Kivell met while still at school. Nan Kivell was also inspired to read history and geography, especially works on European voyagers in the Pacific. 

Nan Kivell worked on the La Tène archaeological excavations in Wiltshire, and presented the objects he unearthed to the Wiltshire Archaeological and Natural History Society Museum in Devizes.

Nan Kivell's association with the Redfern Gallery began in 1925. It had been founded two years earlier by two wealthy Englishmen and by 1931, Nan Kivell was managing director. He ran the gallery in association with his Australian business partner, Harry Tatlock Miller.

Through the Redfern Gallery, Nan Kivell encouraged and helped to establish many British artists including Henry Moore, Barbara Hepworth and Graham Sutherland. He also helped to introduce a number of important European artists to England such as Pierre Bonnard, Chaïm Soutine, Max Ernst, Pablo Picasso and Édouard Vuillard. He gave encouragement to an emerging generation of Australian painters and designers including Sidney Nolan and Loudon Sainthill.

Although living mainly in London, he also maintained a mansion named El Farah (Paradise) in Morocco, where he maintained a long-running sexual relationship with his local chauffeur.

Nan Kivell collected books, paintings, prints, documents, manuscripts and artefacts relating to the history of Australia, New Zealand and the Pacific. 

Originally conceived as the basis of a pictorial history of Australia and New Zealand, Nan Kivell's collection began to extend beyond the purely pictorial. It came to encompass a whole range of documentary evidence created during the voyages of discovery, exploration and colonisation of the Antipodes in the seventeenth, eighteenth and nineteenth centuries, and the material produced as a result of those voyages. His collection also included Māori ceremonial war clubs, Māori language publications and manuscripts, emu eggs, scrimshaw, Aboriginal king plates, a compass and sundial and Thomas Baines’ magnificent painted lantern slides of the mid-1850s. By the late 1940s, Nan Kivell's collection had become substantial and was housed in various locations around England. In 1946, concerned about the safety and preservation of the collection, Nan Kivell began negotiations with representatives in London of the then Commonwealth National Library, the present day National Library of Australia (NLA). In 1949 the first consignment of pictures, books and other material reached Canberra on loan to the Library, which then sought, over a decade, to bring the collection into Australian ownership. In 1992, 32 works from the collection were placed on long-term loan to the National Gallery of Australia. This arrangement was ordered by the then Prime Minister of Australia, Paul Keating, after the National Gallery and National Library disputed ownership of the collection.

Honours
On the recommendation of the Australian Government, Nan Kivell was appointed a Companion of the Order of St Michael and St George (CMG) in 1966 for "services to the Australian National Library". In 1976 he was made a Knight Bachelor, again by Australia. It has been suggested one of his motivations in selling his collection of Australiana at a fraction of its true value was to gain the knighthood he had long coveted for the purposes of social advancement.

Death
He died on 7 June 1977 in Paddington, London and was buried in the parish churchyard at West Lavington, Wiltshire. He attempted to obscure his illegitimacy even beyond the grave, by having a false date of birth inscribed on his tomb.

References
Pauline Fanning, "The Australasian Collection of Mr Rex Nan Kivell in the National Library Australia, Canberra", Australian Library Journal, Vol. 11, No.3, July 1962.
Michelle Hetherington, "Paradise Possessed: the Rex Nan Kivell Collection (A National Library of Australia Exhibition)", National Library of Australia News, Vol. 8, Issue 11, 1 August 1998.
Susan Shortridge, Paradise Possessed: The Rex Nan Kivell Collection, Canberra: National Library of Australia, 1998.

Notes

Further reading

External links
Sir Rex Nan Kivell at Australian Dictionary of Biography
Rex Nan Kivell entry, Oxford Dictionary of National Biography (online edition), November 2020  
Military Personnel File online; digitised record at Archives New Zealand (NZEF No 27034).

1898 births
1977 deaths
British art collectors
Companions of the Order of St Michael and St George
Knights Bachelor
New Zealand knights
New Zealand art collectors
New Zealand expatriates in the United Kingdom
People from Christchurch
People from Paddington
People from Wiltshire
Alumni of the Royal College of Science
British LGBT businesspeople
New Zealand LGBT businesspeople
Australian book and manuscript collectors